Ben Wa balls, also known as orgasm balls,  or Venus balls ( "vagina ball", or  "internal-use ball"), are small, marble-sized balls, usually hollow and containing a small weight, that roll around and are used for sexual stimulation by insertion into the vagina. Available in a variety of forms, the balls may be solid, or contain clappers or chimes within. Other, larger versions made of plastic encasing lesser balls are called Duotone balls. They are used by inserting them into the vagina and using the pubococcygeus muscles to hold them in, stimulating movement and/or vibration. Ben Wa balls should not be confused with anal kegel exercisers and prostate stimulators: Ben Wa balls sometimes have a retrieval string or attachment of some sort, but they do not have an adequately flared base for safe anal play.

Ben Wa balls have a varied history; their origin and method of construction varies depending upon location. Most information concerning Ben Wa balls is vague and probably apocryphal. Originally they were made of a single ball placed in the vagina, used to enhance the act of sexual intercourse, but then evolved into multiple metal covered balls linked by either a chain or silk string for easy removal. Use of Ben Wa balls creates a subtle stimulation, not meant to bring the user to immediate orgasm but rather to tease. It is possible to leave Ben Wa balls in one's vagina all day, or use them while seated in a rocking chair, for an effect that some find pleasurable. Health experts caution against prolonged placement of foreign objects in the vagina due to the risk of infection.

Ben Wa balls may also be used to increase the strength of the pelvic floor muscles, much as Taoist sexual practices have been used for centuries and the Kegel exercises are used today. Similar to Kegel exercises, Ben Wa balls and other shaped vaginal weightlifting equipment are recommended by gynecologists and obstetricians to increase vaginal elasticity and bladder control. Vaginal weights come in a spherical shape and are used in increasing weights to strengthen the vagina, which improves sexual performance.

Practitioners of such spiritual traditions as Tantra and Chinese Taoism believe that Ben Wa Balls are helpful tools to exercise control and to explore the sensual side of an individual.

References

Balls
Masturbation
Female sex toys